Ciro Galvani (1867–1956) was an Italian stage and film actor. He appeared in a number of films directed by Carmine Gallone.

Selected filmography
 La storia di un peccato (1918)
 Nemesis (1920)
 The Ship (1921)
 The Fiery Cavalcade (1925)
 The Last Adventure (1932)
 King of Diamonds (1936)
 Scipio Africanus: The Defeat of Hannibal (1937)

References

Bibliography 
 Goble, Alan. The Complete Index to Literary Sources in Film. Walter de Gruyter, 1999.

External links 
 

1867 births
1956 deaths
Italian male film actors
Italian male silent film actors
20th-century Italian male actors
Italian male stage actors
People from the Province of Bologna